Girls' Generation (Hangul: 소녀시대; RR: Sonyeo Sidae) is a Korean song sung by several artists. The song was originally sung by Lee Seung-chul in 1989, released on his self-titled album Lee Seung-chul: Part 2 (Korean: 이승철 1집 Part 2). It was covered by Maya in 2005 and girl group Girls' Generation in 2007, whose band name is derived from the song's. Gil Hak-mi also performed the song at Superstar K in 2009 and it was released on Love which contains songs by the first Superstar K Top 10.

Girls' Generation version

The remake of "Girls' Generation" was newly arranged by Kenzie. It was released on November 1, 2007, and served as the lead single for the group's debut album,  Girls' Generation. The music video for "Girls' Generation" was released on November 1. To celebrate this cover, Lee Seung-chul appeared on KM M!Countdown with the girls performing the song. The song was also used in episode 76 of You Are My Destiny, a drama series that starred Yoona.

Promotions
Girls' Generation held their comeback performed on M! Countdown, on November 1, 2007. The group also performed the song on various music shows such as Music Bank, Show! Music Core and Inkigayo in November and December.

Music programs awards

Credits and personnel
 Lee Seung-chul – songwriting
 Song Jae Jun – arranger, music
 Kenzie – arranger

References

2007 singles
Girls' Generation songs
Dance-pop songs
SM Entertainment singles
Korean-language songs
1989 songs